Ishq Tamasha is a Pakistani romantic drama television series telecasted on Hum TV since 25 February 2018. Produced by Momina Duraid under MD Productions and directed by Danish Nawaz, it focuses on the lives of 4 individuals : Mehrab, Rushna, Mirha and Arham played by Junaid Khan, Kinza Hashmi, Aiman Khan and Faizan Khawaja respectively. The story besides the characters is about Mirha's life getting turned upside down due to Mehrab and the evil ethics of Rushna.

Plot 
Rushna (Kinza Hashmi) and Mirha (Aiman Khan) are cousin sisters who live together with Rushna's mother (Saba Faisal) and her mother-in-law. Rushna's brother Wahaj (Furqan Qureshi) wants to marry Mirha. Mirha's Chachijaan, who is Rushna's mother does not like her one bit and tries hard to make Mirha look horrible in front of the family. Arham (Faizan Khawaja) sees Rushna at a bakery, and pays for her brownies as the previous brownie she bought fell on the floor and a random kid ran away with it. Arham falls in love with Rushna instantly. He tries too woo her with phone calls and gifts where he manages to make Rushna fall for him, but Rushna misunderstood Mehrab (Junaid Khan) as Arham in a car. Arham decides to propose to her and Rushna rejects him at sight for his looks. Mehrab decides to kidnap Rushna to marry her to Arham to fulfil Arham's desires but when Mehrab rings the door bell and Mirha answers, Mehrab pulls her into a car and takes her to a farmhouse. He kidnaps Mirha thinking she is Rushna and Mirha is forced to live in Mehrab's house because Chachijaan was unwilling to accept her and assumed she was doing wrong. Chachijaan also didn't let Mirha back into the house because she thought this was a good opportunity get Wahaj to stop loving Mirha by assuming and not letting her in. Mehrab brings Arham's proposal again to Rushna; Rushna rejects Arham brutally and Arham drives off in sheer anger and dies in a car accident. Mehrab vows to get revenge and he marries Rushna to get revenge for Arham. Rushna sees Mirha is living in the same house and tries to get her out which she gets successful in, as Chachijaan accepts her back but Mirha is abused and Wahaj does not defend Mirha; which is why Mirha rejects Wahaj's marriage proposal. Rushna thinks Mirha is out to steal her husband which is in bad blood. However she does not know why Mehrab is doing this. Palwasha and Ghufran love each other, and want to elope. When Palwasha goes with Mirha outside she runs away to see Ghufran and they both are about to elope, but Palwasha comes home from fear and to not ‘harm’ her families honour. Mirha leaves the house after Wahaj accuses her of being the reason that Palwasha ran away when in reality Palwasha ran away on her own terms but came back. Rushna's head is hurting a lot as well and she does not know why. Chachijaan kicks Rushna out the house due to her ego; and Wahaj finds out that Chachijaan has always made Mirha look bad and cuts all ties with Chachijaan leaving her sad, but her ego is still bigger than ever as Wahaj is leaving the house and Chachijaan does not bother to even say goodbye and instead says that Wahaj could leave . Mirha lives in a hostel now and continuously she rejects Wahaj, as well as Mehrab. After being rejected by Mirha, Wahaj gives Mirha one last letter with flowers and cries continuously while going back. Rushna is on medication due to having continuous severe headaches.  Rushna has landed in the hospital due to accidental overdose. Rushna, who was admitted in hospital soon realizes her mistake and asks for apology from Mehraab (whom she thought was Arham) for not valuing his love at all and dies emotionally. Palwasha picks up a phone call in which Rushna's shocking  death is revealed. Aqeela, now aware of Rushna's death soon admits her mistake that she was wrong, Aqeela later ask for apology from Mirha for what she did with her. In the end, Mehraab proposes to Mirha and she accepts thus ending the drama.

Cast 
 Junaid Khan as Mehrab
 Aiman Khan as Mirha
 Kinza Hashmi as Rushna
 Faizan Khawaja as Arham; Mehrab's brother
 Alizeh Shah as Palwasha; Rushna's younger sister
 Saba Faisal as Aqeela; Mirha's aunt
 Lubna Aslam as Phuppo; Mehrab and Arham's aunt
 Kinza Malik as Aqeela's sister; Rushna's aunt
 Furqan Qureshi as Wahaj; Rushna's brother
 Areesha Shah as Uswa; Rushna's youngest sister

Soundtrack 
The title song was sung by Sanam Marvi & Sanwal Esakhelvi. The music was composed by Naved Nashad.and the lyrics were penned by Mubashir Hassan.

Broadcast 
Ishq Tamasha originally premiered on 25 February 2018. The serial aired a weekly episode on every Sunday succeeding Tajdeed e Wafa. It was aired on Hum Europe in UK, on Hum TV USA in USA and Hum TV Mena on UAE.

It also aired on national television in Pakistan on PTV Home. The show started to air on 3 June 2020 and aired twice in a week.

The show was also adapted by the Horn Cable Television of Somaliland as Cishqi Tamaashaa.In Arab world, the show was premiered on the subscription channel of MBC group, MBC Plus Drama under the title انتقام. The show was dubbed in Pashto and aired on Hum Pashto 1 under the same title.

Awards and nominations

References

External links

 Official Website

Pakistani drama television series
2018 Pakistani television series debuts
2018 Pakistani television series endings
Urdu-language television shows
Hum TV original programming